Trstena is a village located in the municipality of Vranje, Serbia. According to the 2011 census, the village has a population of 43 people.

References

Populated places in Pčinja District